The Gosselin River is a tributary of the North Shore of the Fortier River (Panache River tributary) which flows successively into the Gatineau River, then into the Ottawa River. The Gosselin River flows in the western part of the city of La Tuque, in the administrative region of Mauricie, in Quebec, in Canada.

The course of the river flows entirely in Gosselin Township.

Forestry has always been the dominant economic activity of this hydrographic sub-catchment. The surface of the river is generally frozen from mid-November to mid-April.

Geography

Toponymy 
The term "Gosselin" is a surname of French origin.

The toponym "Gosselin River" was formalized on December 5, 1968 at the Place Names Bank of the Commission de toponymie du Québec.

See also

Notes and references 

La Tuque, Quebec
Rivers of Mauricie
Landforms of Gatineau